Kuerti, also spelled  Kürti and Kurti, is a surname of Hungarian origin. Notable people with the surname include:

 Anton Kuerti, Austrian-born Canadian conductor
 Julian Kuerti, Canadian conductor, son of Anton
 Miklos Kuerti, physicist

Surnames of Hungarian origin